Bob "The Big Bear" Mirovic (born 25 February 1966) is an Australian boxer of Croatian descent. Standing at 1.96 m (6 ft 5 in) and with a reach of 203 cm (80 inches), he started boxing at the age of 22 in 1987. He has fought a number of famous fighters, including Nikolai Valuev, Joe Bugner and Frans Botha. He has also been a sparring partner of Mike Tyson.

He currently resides in Berkeley Vale, New South Wales.

Professional boxing record 

|-
|align="center" colspan=8|31 Wins (21 knockouts, 10 decisions), 23 Losses (10 knockouts, 13 decisions), 1 Draws 
|-
| align="center" style="border-style: none none solid solid; background: #e3e3e3"|Result
| align="center" style="border-style: none none solid solid; background: #e3e3e3"|Record
| align="center" style="border-style: none none solid solid; background: #e3e3e3"|Opponent
| align="center" style="border-style: none none solid solid; background: #e3e3e3"|Type
| align="center" style="border-style: none none solid solid; background: #e3e3e3"|Round
| align="center" style="border-style: none none solid solid; background: #e3e3e3"|Date
| align="center" style="border-style: none none solid solid; background: #e3e3e3"|Location
| align="center" style="border-style: none none solid solid; background: #e3e3e3"|Notes
|-align=center
|Win
|31-23-1
|align=left| Alipate Liava'a
|UD
|6
|4 February 2011
|align=left|, Punchbowl, Australia
|align=left|
|-
|Win
|30-23-1
|align=left| Bob Gasio
|TKO
|2
|19 November 2010
|align=left| Revesby Workers Club, Revesby, Australia
|align=left|
|-
|Loss
|29-23-1
|align=left| Alex Leapai
|KO
|1
|29 April 2010
|align=left| Gold Coast Convention and Exhibition Centre, Broadbeach, Australia
|align=left|
|-
|Loss
|29-22-1
|align=left| John Hopoate
|UD
|10
|23 July 2009
|align=left| AIS Arena, Bruce, Australia
|align=left|
|-
|Loss
|29-21-1
|align=left| John Hopoate
|TKO
|9
|10 September 2008
|align=left| Gold Coast Convention and Exhibition Centre, Broadbeach, Australia
|align=left|
|-
|Win
|29-20-1
|align=left| Colin Wilson
|KO
|8
|2 November 2007
|align=left| Fankhauser Reserve, Southport, Australia
|align=left|
|-
|Loss
|28-20-1
|align=left| Frans Botha
|UD
|12
|6 July 2007
|align=left| The Carousel Casino and Entertainment World, Temba, Australia
|align=left|
|-
|Loss
|28-19-1
|align=left| Shane Cameron
|KO
|8
|7 March 2007
|align=left| Sydney Entertainment Centre, Sydney, Australia
|align=left|
|-
|Loss
|28-18-1
|align=left| Sinan Samil Sam
|UD
|12
|10 November 2006
|align=left| Alsterdorfer Sporthalle, Alsterdorf, Germany
|align=left|
|-
|Win
|28-17-1
|align=left| Fatu Tuimanono
|KO
|1
|20 September 2006
|align=left| Challenge Stadium, Perth, Australia
|align=left|
|-
|Win
|27-17-1
|align=left| Richard Tutaki
|TKO
|2
|21 July 2006
|align=left| WIN Entertainment Centre, Wollongong, Australia
|align=left|
|-
|Loss
|26-17-1
|align=left| Okello Peter
|UD
|12
|15 April 2006
|align=left| Korakuen Hall, Tokyo, Japan
|align=left|
|-
|Win
|26-16-1
|align=left| Richard Tutaki
|KO
|2
|9 December 2005
|align=left| Blacktown International Sportspark, Blacktown, Australia
|align=left|
|-
|Loss
|25-16-1
|align=left| Rob Calloway
|UD
|12
|24 June 2005
|align=left| Royal Pines Resort, Ashmore, Australia
|align=left|
|-
|Loss
|25-15-1
|align=left| Timo Hoffmann
|UD
|12
|12 March 2005
|align=left| Zwickau, Germany
|align=left|
|-
|Win
|25-14-1
|align=left| Colin Wilson
|UD
|10
|17 December 2004
|align=left| Royal Pines Resort, Ashmore, Australia
|align=left|
|-
|Win
|24-14-1
|align=left| Hiriwa Te Rangi
|KO
|4
|4 December 2004
|align=left| SKYCITY, Auckland, New Zealand
|align=left|
|-
|Loss
|23-14-1
|align=left| Matt Skelton
|RTD
|4
|5 June 2004
|align=left| York Hall, London, England
|align=left|
|-
|Win
|23-13-1
|align=left| Mosese Kavika
|TKO
|1
|7 May 2004
|align=left| s, Newcastle, Australia
|align=left|
|-
|Win
|22-13-1
|align=left| Paul Robinson
|TKO
|4
|16 April 2004
|align=left| Dandenong Basketball Stadium, Dandenong, Australia
|align=left|
|-
|Win
|21-13-1
|align=left| Silovate Rasaku Junior
|KO
|3
|21 March 2004
|align=left| Challenge Stadium, Perth, Australia
|align=left|
|-
|Loss
|20-13-1
|align=left| Nikolay Valuev
|UD
|8
|16 August 2003
|align=left| Nürburgring, Nürburg, Germany
|align=left|
|-
|Win
|20-12-1
|align=left| Danny Buzza
|KO
|4
|11 July 2003
|align=left| Carrington Street Oval, Gosford, Australia
|align=left|
|-
|Win
|19-12-1
|align=left| Mitch O'Hello
|KO
|3
|27 June 2003
|align=left| Metro City Nightclub, Northbridge, Australia
|align=left|
|-
|Loss
|18-12-1
|align=left| Danny Williams
|TKO
|4
|26 April 2003
|align=left| , London, England
|align=left|
|-
|Win
|18-11-1
|align=left| Auckland Auimatagi
|TKO
|5
|7 March 2003
|align=left| Carrington Street Oval, Gosford, Australia
|align=left|
|-
|Win
|17-11-1
|align=left| Phil Gregory
|TKO
|3
|7 February 2003
|align=left| Fankhauser Reserve, Southport, Australia
|align=left|
|-
|Win
|16-11-1
|align=left| Auckland Auimatagi
|TKO
|3
|15 November 2002
|align=left| s, Newcastle, Australia
|align=left|
|-
|Win
|15-11-1
|align=left| Roger Izonritei
|KO
|5
|18 September 2002
|align=left| Hordern Pavilion, Sydney, Australia
|align=left|
|-
|Win
|14-11-1
|align=left| Colin Wilson
|SD
|12
|10 May 2002
|align=left| Carrington Street Oval, Gosford, Australia
|align=left|
|-
|Loss
|13-11-1
|align=left| Okello Peter
|KO
|5
|1 December 2001
|align=left| City Gymnasium, Tōkai, Japan
|align=left|
|-
|Win
|13-10-1
|align=left| Nathan Briggs
|KO
|6
|8 July 2001
|align=left| Jupiters Hotel and Casino, Broadbeach, Australia
|align=left|
|-
|Win
|12-10-1
|align=left| Peau Lemauga
|KO
|3
|29 September 2000
|align=left| Noumea Basketball Stadium, Noumea, New Caledonia
|align=left|
|-
|Win
|11-10-1
|align=left| Clay Auimatagi
|PTS
|4
|25 August 2000
|align=left| Bankstown PCYC, Sydney, Australia
|align=left|
|-
|Loss
|10-10-1
|align=left| Aisea Nama
|TKO
|4
|28 July 1999
|align=left| Croatian Culture Centre, Henderson, New Zealand
|align=left|
|-
|Loss
|10-9-1
|align=left| Kali Meehan
|KO
|4
|25 June 1999
|align=left| Wyong Stadium, Wyong, Australia
|align=left|
|-
|Win
|10-8-1
|align=left| John Wyborn
|PTS
|10
|30 April 1999
|align=left| Wyong Stadium, Wyong, Australia
|align=left|
|-
|Win
|9-8-1
|align=left| Danny Buzza
|MD
|12
|15 March 1999
|align=left| Star City Casino, Sydney, Australia
|align=left|
|-
|Win
|8-8-1
|align=left| Colin Wilson
|PTS
|12
|5 September 1998
|align=left| , Nerang, Australia
|align=left|
|-
|Loss
|7-8-1
|align=left| Joe Bugner
|SD
|12
|20 April 1998
|align=left| s, Carrara, Australia
|align=left|
|-
|Loss
|7-7-1
|align=left| Justin Fortune
|TKO
|6
|6 December 1997
|align=left| Stockland Stadium, Townsville, Australia
|align=left|
|-
|Loss
|7-6-1
|align=left| James Grima
|PTS
|12
|20 April 1997
|align=left| Billboard Nite Club, Melbourne, Australia
|align=left|
|-
|Win
|7-5-1
|align=left| James Ali
|KO
|4
|26 January 1997
|align=left| Broadmeadows, Australia
|align=left|
|-
|Loss
|6-5-1
|align=left| James Grima
|MD
|12
|30 October 1995
|align=left| Carrington Street Oval, Gosford, Australia
|align=left|
|-
|Win
|6-4-1
|align=left| Colin Wilson
|TKO
|8
|19 May 1995
|align=left| Henson Park, Sydney, Australia
|align=left|
|-
|Loss
|5-4-1
|align=left| August Tanuvasa
|SD
|8
|7 April 1995
|align=left| Doyalson Stadium, Doyalson, Australia
|align=left|
|-
|Win
|5-3-1
|align=left| Matthew K. Reid
|PTS
|10
|20 January 1995
|align=left| Doyalson Stadium, Doyalson, Australia
|align=left|
|-
|Win
|4-3-1
|align=left| Matthew K. Reid
|TKO
|4
|29 October 1994
|align=left| St Marys Band Club, Sydney, Australia
|align=left|
|-
|Loss
|3-3-1
|align=left| James Grima
|TKO
|2
|1 May 1993
|align=left| Henson Park, Sydney, Australia
|align=left|
|-
|Draw
|3-2-1
|align=left| Steve Unterholzer
|PTS
|8
|26 December 1992
|align=left| Ettalong, Australia
|align=left|
|-
|Win
|3-2
|align=left| Niko Degai
|SD
|6
|28 March 1990
|align=left| Parramatta Stadium, Sydney, Australia
|align=left|
|-
|Win
|2-2
|align=left| Mark Moran
|SD
|4
|29 July 1988
|align=left| Groundz Precinct, Dapto, Australia
|align=left|
|-
|Loss
|1-2
|align=left| Arzan Basic
|PTS
|4
|16 October 1987
|align=left| Hordern Pavilion, Sydney, Australia
|align=left|
|-
|Loss
|1-1
|align=left| Arzan Basic
|PTS
|6
|7 August 1987
|align=left| Blacktown Stadium, Sydney, Australia
|align=left|
|-
|Win
|1-0
|align=left|Sam Kurukitoga
|TKO
|3
|15 May 1987
|align=left| Cronulla Workingmen's Club, Sydney, Australia
|align=left|
|}

External links

1966 births
Living people
Australian people of Croatian descent
Heavyweight boxers
Australian male boxers
People from Dubrovnik